This is the results breakdown of the local elections held in Asturias on 24 May 2015. The following tables show detailed results in the autonomous community's most populous municipalities, sorted alphabetically.

Opinion polls

Overall

City control
The following table lists party control in the most populous municipalities, including provincial capitals (shown in bold). Gains for a party are displayed with the cell's background shaded in that party's colour.

Municipalities

Avilés
Population: 81,659

Gijón
Population: 275,735

Langreo
Population: 42,403

Mieres
Population: 41,013

Oviedo
Population: 223,765

San Martín del Rey Aurelio
Population: 17,460

Siero
Population: 52,380

See also
2015 Asturian regional election

References

Asturias
2015